Heinz Thilo (8 October 1911 in Elberfeld  13 May 1945 in Hohenelbe) was a German SS officer and a physician in the Nazi concentration camp Auschwitz.

Thilo joined the Nazi party in December 1930 and the SS in 1934. From 1938 to 1941 he worked as a gynaecologist for the Lebensborn organization. After six months of war service he was assigned to the Auschwitz concentration camp in July 1942. There he became responsible for the infirmary camp with the rank of Obersturmführer. Thilo called the camp the "anus mundi" ("anus of the world"). He was one of the physicians commonly performing the "selections" in which incoming Jews were divided into those deemed able to work and those who were to be gassed immediately.  Thilo also participated in the liquidation of the Theresienstadt family camp on March 8, 1944, when 3,791 Jews were murdered in the gas chambers.

In October 1944 Thilo was transferred to Gross-Rosen where he served as camp physician until February 1945. He fled shortly before the camp's liberation. 

After the war, Thilo was arrested. He committed suicide in prison.

References

External links 
Image of Dr Thilo on the ramp, making selections

1911 births
1945 suicides
Auschwitz concentration camp medical personnel
German gynaecologists
Physicians in the Nazi Party
Nazis who committed suicide in prison custody
SS-Hauptsturmführer
Gross-Rosen concentration camp personnel
Suicides in Czechoslovakia

Holocaust perpetrators in Poland